Allen-Mangum House is a historic plantation house and national historic district located near Grissom, Granville County, North Carolina.

Built as the main residence and headquarters of an agricultural forced labor camp, the house includes a rear block was built about 1848 and a front block added about 1880. It is a two-story frame dwelling with Greek Revival, Gothic Revival, and Italianate style design elements. It has an I-house form and a two-story rear ell.  It features a front porch with an exceptionally intricate, cutout screen of woodwork draped between the tops of square bracketed posts. Also on the property is the contributing family cemetery.

It was listed on the National Register of Historic Places in 1988.

References

Plantation houses in North Carolina
Houses on the National Register of Historic Places in North Carolina
Historic districts on the National Register of Historic Places in North Carolina
Greek Revival houses in North Carolina
Italianate architecture in North Carolina
Gothic Revival architecture in North Carolina
Houses completed in 1848
Houses in Granville County, North Carolina
National Register of Historic Places in Granville County, North Carolina